Romuald Gutt (6 February 1888 – 3 September 1974) was a Polish architect. His work was part of the architecture event in the art competition at the 1936 Summer Olympics.

References

1888 births
1974 deaths
Burials at Powązki Cemetery
20th-century Polish architects
Olympic competitors in art competitions
Architects from Warsaw